The following lists events that happened in 1977 in Libya.

Incumbents
 Prime Minister: Abdessalam Jalloud (until 2 March), Abdul Ati al-Obeidi (starting 2 March)

Events

March
 1 March – Abdul Ati al-Obeidi is appointed General Secretary of the General People's Committee.
 2 March – the General People's Congress adopts the "Declaration of the Establishment of the People's Authority" and proclaims the Socialist People's Libyan Arab Jamahiriya, revising the 1969 constitution.

April
 Demonstrators attack Egypt's embassy

June
 Libyan protesters begin a "March on Cairo" as they heads towards the Egyptian border. The Libyans wanted to demonstrate against the increasing likelihood that Egypt would enter into a peace treaty with Israel.

July
 21 July – gun battles between Egyptian and Libyan forces on the border, followed by land and air strikes
 24 July – armistice. Libyan casualties were 400 dead or wounded, while Egyptian casualties were roughly 100 dead.

August
 An agreement to exchange prisoners of war leads to a relaxation of tension between the two states

November
 Libya officially leaves the Federation of Arab Republics

December
 2 december 1977 – a Tupolev Tu-154 runs out of fuel near Benghazi. A total of 59 passengers are killed in the crash.

1977–78 Libyan Premier League

 
Years of the 20th century in Libya
Libya
Libya
1970s in Libya